Sam Underhill (born 22 July 1996) is an English professional rugby union player who plays as a flanker for Bath and the England national team. He studied Politics and Economics at the University of Bath. He previously attended Sir Thomas Rich's School in Gloucester.

Club career
At the age of just 17, Underhill made his debut for Gloucester in the Anglo-Welsh Cup, before making his Premiership debut at the age of 18.

At the beginning of the 2015–16 season, Underhill joined Welsh Pro12 regional team Ospreys. He made his debut in a fixture against Ulster and was Man-of-the-Match in his first start for the team, which was against Munster.

On 11 January 2017, it was confirmed that Underhill would join English side Bath for the 2017–18 season.

International career
Underhill captained England U18s during their successful 2014 FIRA tournament and played nine times during an unbeaten season, including scoring a try on debut in a player of the match performance against Scotland, captaining the team to a win in the FIRA tournament and a win against South Africa.

Underhill was called up to the senior England squad by coach Eddie Jones for their 2017 summer tour of Argentina. He made his senior debut in the final test of the tour as England defeated Argentina to win the series 2-0.

On 12 August 2019, Underhill was named in Eddie Jones' 31-man squad for the 2019 Rugby World Cup. He was one of the stars of the semi-final victory over New Zealand, helping England to reach their first World Cup final since 2007. Underhill started in the 2019 Rugby World Cup Final as England were defeated by South Africa to finish runners up.

After the World Cup Underhill was a member of the squad that won the 2020 Six Nations Championship and later that year he started for the England side that defeated France in extra-time to win the Autumn Nations Cup. In July 2021 he scored his first try at International level in a game against the United States.

International tries

Honours
England
 Six Nations Championship: 2020
 Autumn Nations Cup: 2020
 Rugby World Cup runner-up: 2019

References

External links
Bath Rugby Player Profile
ESPN Player Profile

1996 births
Living people
Bath Rugby players
England international rugby union players
English rugby union players
Gloucester Rugby players
Ospreys (rugby union) players
Rugby union flankers
Sportspeople from Dayton, Ohio